was an Ainu singer and mukkuri player. Her participation in Oki Kano's second album Hankapuy, helped her gain recognition. She recorded several albums, including her solo debut album, Ihunke, produced by Oki in 2001, that was praised by critics and artists alike, and many music publications in Japan declared it the best world music album of the year. It was followed by her second studio album, Upopo Sanke, in 2003, with Chikar Studio, which gained worldwide attention.

She died from cancer on July 15, 2004, at her hometown Makubetsu-cho, Hokkaido, at the age of 71.

She is featured posthumously on the Samurai Champloo soundtrack with her song . The seventeenth episode, "Lullabies of the Lost", which featured this song, was dedicated to her memory with the message "May her soul rest in peace" in the ending credits.

Discography
Ihunke (2001)
Spirits From Ainu (2002)
Upopo Sanke (2003)
Keutowm

External links
Umako Ando receives the Ainu Cultural Award
Umeko Ando biography in Oki's official website
Umeko Ando at Discogs

1932 births
2004 deaths
Japanese Ainu people
People from Obihiro, Hokkaido
Musicians from Hokkaido
20th-century Japanese musicians
Ainu artists
Japanese folk singers
20th-century Japanese women singers
20th-century Japanese singers